The Châteaux de Saint-Hilaire et des Plas are two historic castles in Curemonte, Corrèze, Nouvelle-Aquitaine, France.

History
The Château de Saint-Hilaire, in the centre, was built in the 13th century. The Château des Plas, which surrounds it, was built in the 17th century.

Architectural significance
They have been listed as an official monument since 1991.

References

Castles in Nouvelle-Aquitaine
Monuments historiques of Nouvelle-Aquitaine